Dobrodošli na okean (Welcome to the Ocean) is the second album by the Serbian alternative rock band Repetitor released by the Slovenian independent record label Moonlee Records in 2012.

Track listing 
All  written by Repetitor, all lyrics written by Boris Vlastelica.

Personnel 
Repetitor
 Boris Vlastelica — guitar, vocals
 Ana-Marija Cupin — bass, vocals
 Milena Milutinović — drums

Additional personnel
 Ana-Marija Cupin — artwork by [design] 
 Primož Vozelj — recorded by
 Goran Crevar — mixed by
 Carl Saff — mastered by

References 
 Album review at Popboks
 Dobrodošli na Okean at Discogs

2012 albums
Repetitor albums